Bishop Street Methodist Chapel, also known as the Wesleyan Chapel, is church overlooking Town Hall Square in Leicester, England, U.K.

The chapel was built in 1815 as a Methodist chapel. in the Georgian Neo-Classical style by the architect and Methodist minister Reverend William Jenkins (1763-1844). The organ in the chapel predates the chapel itself by over 100 years, the organ case by “Father” Smith, organ builder to Charles II.

It is a Grade II listed building (1074061) on the National Heritage List for England, added in 1950 as Wesleyan Chapel, Bishop Street. It part of collection of listed buildings on Bishop Street around Town Hall Square comprising Leicester Town Hall, Fountain and War Memorial, 7–9, Every Street and Nos 6–8, The Royal Hotel, Nos 17, 19 and 21 Horsefair Street.

See also
John Wesley
Methodist churches in Leicester
Castle Donington Methodist Church
Great Glen Methodist Church
List of Methodist churches (world-wide, including England)

References 

Churches in Leicester
19th-century churches in the United Kingdom
History of Leicester
Grade II listed churches in Leicestershire
Methodist churches in Leicestershire